Hanoi central station or simply Hanoi station is one of the main stations of Vietnam Railways, serving as the terminus of 5 of 7 active routes in the national network, including the North–South railway (Reunification Express), the Hanoi–Lào Cai railway, the Hanoi–Haiphong Railway, the Hanoi–Đồng Đăng Railway, and the Hanoi–Quán Triều Railway. The station serves the capital city of Hanoi.  The station is located at 120 Lê Duẩn Street, Cua Nam Ward, Hoan Kiem District in central Hanoi.

History 

In 1895, The French Indochina choose the Hang Co Market area to build the main station of Hanoi. The old name of this station is Hang Co railway station. Hanoi railway station was built by France and opened in 1902. That time, Hanoi station had a Western-style design and It was design by Henri Vildieu. Hanoi railway station is also one of the largest station in South East Asia at that time. The building was damaged in the Vietnam War 1972 and in 1976 the central hall was rebuilt in modern style, preserving the historic side wings (only the middle was bombed).

Services
Passenger services departing from Hanoi Main station:

The train to Dong Dang is metre gauge and cannot continue on the Chinese railway network. Passengers destined for China must connect to a Chinese train at Pingxiang. Through trains to China depart from Gia Lâm rather than the main Hanoi Railway Station.

Trains to Hai Phong reach Hanoi Station on weekends and holidays only. During weekdays, the terminus is Long Biên Station

The train to Nanning departs from Hanoi Gia Lam
2 more trains to Haiphong departing from Hanoi Gia Lam

Gallery

References

Railway stations in Hanoi
Hanoi Metro stations
Railway stations opened in 1902
French colonial architecture in Vietnam